Paul Workman is a Canadian journalist. He is the CTV News LONDON, GB, Bureau Chief, filing his first report on February 3, 2009. Workman was formerly the South Asia Bureau Chief based in New Delhi, India. Prior to joining CTV News on July 13, 2006, he was a journalist for CBC News for over twenty years. Workman is guest-hosting the science news show Daily Planet on Discovery Channel.

External links
 CTV Announces Paul Workman as Washington Bureau Chief
 CTV News Team
 Newswire announcement of move to CTV News
 CTV.ca - Veteran CBC journalist Paul Workman joins CTV
 CTV.ca - Detailed Description of 2006 move to CTV

Year of birth missing (living people)
Living people
Canadian television reporters and correspondents
Place of birth missing (living people)
CTV Television Network people
CBC Television people
20th-century Canadian journalists
21st-century Canadian journalists